Saptari, a part of Madhesh Province, is one of the seventy-seven districts of Nepal. Its district headquarter is Rajbiraj. Saptari is an Outer Terai district. Saptari is renowned for its agricultural output, and is bordered on the east by the massive Sapta Koshi river.

There are nine municipalities in Saptari: Dakneshwori, Rajbiraj, Bodebarsain, Hanumannagar Kankalini, Kanchanrup, Saptakoshi, surunga, Shambhunath and Khadak. Other small towns include Mahuli, Kathauna Fattepur, Pato and Itahari Bishnupur with the area government "Machha Palan Kendra" fish farming centre.

The famous Chhinnamasta temple is one of the Shakti Peeths and Kankalini Temple are also located in Saptari District. Saptari has highest growth in Maithili literature.

Temples

Chinnamasta Bhagawati

Chinnamasta Bhagawati (छिन्नमस्ता भगवती) is a temple of Eastern Nepal. It is situated in Chinnamasta VDC, Saptari,  from Rajbiraj and also near to Indian Border. It is a main attraction for Indian pilgrims. People are likely to come here in Bada Dashain. Some thousands of goats are sacrificed here during dashain.

Shambhunath

Shambhunath (शम्भुनाथ) is another one of the famous temples of Eastern Nepal. It is situated in Shambhunath,  from Rajbiraj and also near Mahendra Highway. This temple is a main attraction for Indian pilgrims. People are likely to come here in Siruwa Mela during month of Baisakh (the first month of Bikram Sambat).

Kankalini Temple

Kankalini Temple (कंकालिनी) is another temple situated in this district; it is located in Bhardah-1 of Hanumannagar Kankalini Municipality. This temple is main attraction for Indian pilgrims. Kankalini Temple has great religious importance. Like most of the other Shakti Peethas in Nepal, this temple, too, has a legend attached to it. According to the legend, the people settled in Bhardaha village had started to use the land for farming, however, while digging, some farmers had found a stone statue carved beautifully with the image of Goddess Durga and in that very place, this temple is said to have been built. It is believed that when a devotee worships with great devotion and true heart in the temple, their wish comes true. So, thousands of peoples from many part of the country come to this temple to worship the avatar of Goddess Durga, known famously as goddess Kankalini.

Geography and climate

Education 
Mahendra Bindeshwari Multiple Campus- TU Affiliated Public Campus located in Rajbiraj offering LLB, BBS, BA, MBS, M.Ed.
National People College- TU Affiliated Private College established in 2013 AD Offers Masters and Bachelors level of Programs in Management and Humanities Faculties. It is the 1st Private College of Saptari District Offering the Subjects of Study like MA-SOCIOLOGY, MBS, BA-RD and SOCIOLOGY. The college is Ultramodern and is Located in Kanchanrup Munacipality.

HSEB affiliated +2 colleges are:
Happyland HSS and college
Laligurans EBHSS or Paradise Campus
Caliber International College
Mission College
Kshitiz Edu. Foundation
Chinnamasta College
Annapurna Multiple College, Kanchanpur Beriyar, Saptari - just the east of UTL Tower
Rajbiraj Model Campus

Demographics
At the time of the 2011 Nepal census, Saptari District had a population of 639,284. Of these, 79.1% spoke Maithili, 10.4% Tharu, 4.1% Nepali and 3.9% Urdu as their first language.

40.5% of the population in the district spoke Nepali, 5.9% Hindi, 3.0% Maithili, 1.3% Tharu and 0.9% Urdu as their second language.

Administration 
The district consists of eighteen municipalities, out of which nine are urban municipalities and nine are rural municipalities. These are as follows:

 Bodebarsain Municipality
Dakneshwori Municipality
 Hanumannagar Kankalini Municipality
 Kanchanrup Municipality
 Khadak Municipality
Sambhunath Municipality
 Saptakoshi Municipality
 Surunga Municipality
 Rajbiraj Municipality
 Agnisaira Krishnasavaran Rural Municipality
 Balan-Bihul Rural Municipality
 Rajgadh Rural Municipality
 Bishnupur Rural Municipality
Chhinnamasta Rural Municipality
Mahadeva Rural Municipality
 Rupani Rural Municipality
 Tilathi Koiladi Rural Municipality
 Tirhut Rural Municipality

Former Village Development Committees (VDCs) and Municipalities 

Arnaha
Aurahi, now Dakneshwori Municipality ward No. 6
Babhangama katti
Badgama, Vagni maleth
Bainiya
Bairawa, now Kanchanrup Municipality ward no. 1
Bakdhauwa
Banarjhula
Banaula, now Dakneshwori Municipality ward No. 10
Banauli
Baramjhiya, now Kanchan Rup Mun.
Barhmapur
Barsain
Basbiti
Bathnaha
Belhi now Khadk Mun ward No 2
Belhi Chapena
Bhagawatpur
Bhardaha, now Hanumannagar Kankalini Mun.
Bhutahi, now Dakneshwori Municipality ward No. 4
Birpur Barahi
Bishariya-Bhelhi
Bodebarsain Municipality 
Boriya
Brahamapur, now Dakneshwori Municipality ward No. 7
Chhinnamasta
Dakneshwori Municipality
Dauda
Daulatpur, Now surunga Mun Wada No 3
Deuri
Deurimaruwa
Dhanagadi
Babhangam katti
Dharampur, now Kanchan Rup Mun.
Dhodhanpur, now Kanchan Rup Mun.
Didhawa
Diman
Gamhariya Parwaha
Gobargada, now Hanumannagar Kankalini Mun.
Goithi
Hanumannagar, now Municipality
Hanumannagar Kankalini Municipality
Hardiya Now surunga Mun Wada No 2
Hariharpur
Haripur Now surunga Mun wada No 7
Inarwa, now Hanumannagar Kankalini Mun.
Inarwa Phulbariya
Itahari Bishnupur
Jagatpur, now Kanchan Rup Mun.
Jamuni Madhapura
Jandaul
Jhutaki
Joginiya-1, now Hanumannagar Kankalini Mun.
Joginiya-2, now Hanumannagar Kankalini Mun.
Kabilasha, now Dakneshwori Municipality ward No. 1
Kachan
Kanchan Rup Municipality
Kalyanpur Khadk Mun 6, 7, 8
Kamalpur, now Saptaskoshi Mun.
Kanchanpur
Kataiya, Now Rupani Gaunpalika
Kathauna
Khadgapur, included in Bodebarsain Mun.
Khojpur Now Khadk Mun 5
Ko. Madhepura
Kochabakhari
Koiladi
Kushaha
Lalapati
Launiya
Lohajara
Madhawapur, now Hanumannagar Kankalini Mun.
Madhupati now surunga mun Wada no 4
Mahadeva
Maina Kaderi
Maina Sahasrabahu
Malekpur
Maleth
Malhanama
Malhaniya, now Hanumannagar Kankalini Mun.
Manraja, included in Bodebarsain Mun.
Mauwaha
Mohanpur
Nargho
Negada
Odraha
Pakari
Pansera
Jandaul
Parasbani
Paterwa
Pato, now Dakneshwori Municipality ward No. 5
Patthargada, now Dakneshwori Municipality ward No. 9
Phakira
Pharseth
Phattepur, now Saptakoshi Mun.
Phulkahi
(Parwaha)
Pipra (Purba), now Kanchan Rup Mun.
Pipra (West) surunga mun wada No 1
Portaha, now Hanumannagar Kankalini Mun.
Rajbiraj Municipality
Rajgadh Rural Municipality
Ramnagar
Rampur Jamuwa
Rampur Malhaniya, now Hanumannagar Kankalini Mun.
Rautahat
Rayapur
Rupnagar, now Kanchan Rup Mun.
Shambhunath Municipality
Sankarpura
Saptakoshi Municipality
Sarashwar
Simraha Sigiyaun
Siswa Beihi now khadak Mun Wada No 1,2
Sitapur
Tarahi, now Dakneshwori Municipality ward No. 3
Terahota
Theliya, now Kancha
Tilathi
Trikola

Notable persons 

 Mehboob Alam, cricketer who was the first bowler to take all ten wickets in an innings in an ICC recognized international tournament match.
 Teju Lal Chaudhary, Nepali Congress politician and member of House of Representatives
 Parmanand Jha, first Vice President of Nepal and ex Supreme Court Judge
 Udit Narayan, Indian playback singer
 C. K. Raut, politician, computer scientist and founder of Janamat Party
 Gajendra Narayan Singh, founder of Nepal Sadbhawana Party
 Ram Raja Prasad Singh, politician

See also
Chandra Nahar Canal
Zones of Nepal

References

 

 
Districts of Nepal established during Rana regime or before
Districts of Madhesh Province